Ab Kori (also Romanized as Āb Korī; also known as Āb Cherī) is a village in Tayebi-ye Garmsiri-ye Jonubi Rural District, in the Central District of Kohgiluyeh County, Kohgiluyeh and Boyer-Ahmad Province, Iran. At the 2006 census, its population was 116, in 20 families.

References 

Populated places in Kohgiluyeh County